Maik Bullmann (also known as Mike Bullmann, born 25 April 1967) is a German Greco-Roman wrestler. He is an Olympic champion and three-time World Champion.

Olympics
Bullmann competed at the 1992 Summer Olympics in Barcelona where he received a gold medal in Greco-Roman wrestling, the light heavyweight class.

He received a bronze medal at the 1996 Summer Olympics in Atlanta.

World championships
Bullmann won a gold medal at the 1989 World Wrestling Championships, and again in 1990 and in 1991.

Awards
He was awarded the Bambi prize in 1992.

References

External links
 

1967 births
Living people
Sportspeople from Frankfurt (Oder)
German male sport wrestlers
Olympic wrestlers of Germany
Olympic wrestlers of East Germany
Wrestlers at the 1988 Summer Olympics
Wrestlers at the 1992 Summer Olympics
Wrestlers at the 1996 Summer Olympics
Olympic gold medalists for Germany
Olympic bronze medalists for Germany
Olympic medalists in wrestling
World Wrestling Championships medalists
Medalists at the 1996 Summer Olympics
Medalists at the 1992 Summer Olympics
European Wrestling Championships medalists